The following highways are numbered 803:

Costa Rica
 National Route 803

United States
  Louisiana Highway 803
 Louisiana Highway 803-1
 Louisiana Highway 803-2
 Louisiana Highway 803-3
 Maryland State Route 803 (former)
Territories
  Puerto Rico Highway 803